FC Zebra is a football team based in Baucau, East Timor that plays in the Liga Futebol Amadora. The team currently dispute the second division of the Liga Futebol Amadora. It also participates in other competitions organized by the FFTL, such as Taça 12 de Novembro and Copa FFTL.

Squad (2020/2021)
Updated September 2020.

20. Paulino Rosario (GK)
7. Agustinho Guterres
5. Camilo Boavida
13. Elvis Silva
5. Vasco Boavida
4. Rique Marçal
17. Jeronimo Soares
18. Leonel Gama
11. Gaspar Ximenes
19. Rui boavida
22. Juvencio Castro

1. Belarmino Belo (GK)
6. Calistro Pereira
8. Domingos Freitas
15. Deolindo Peloi
21. Rui Carlos
12. Helder Lopes
10. Antonio Jesus
Head Coach. Rogerio Mok

Continental record

Former coaches
Alberto Jaime Ribeiro

References

External links
FC Zebra at national-football-teams.com

Football clubs in East Timor
Football
Sport in Dili